Poeciloflata is a genus of planthoppers in the family Flatidae. It was first described by Leopold Melichar in 1901. Species in the genus are found in Sulawesi, Indonesia.

Species
Poeciloflata lurida (Melichar, 1902)
Poeciloflata modesta (Donovan, 1805)
Poeciloflata viridana (Donovan, 1805)

References 

Flatidae
Auchenorrhyncha genera
Insects of Indonesia